Pavo is a city that is divided by the county line between Brooks and Thomas counties in the U.S. state of Georgia. It is part of the Valdosta, Georgia Metropolitan Statistical Area. The population was 627 at the 2010 census.

The city is home to a branch of the Thomas County Public Library System.

Pavo was featured in country music star Alan Jackson's video for his hit song "Little Man", lamenting the decline of small-town America.

Geography
Pavo is located at  (30.960341, -83.739352). Georgia State Route 122 (Harris Street) passes through the center of town, leading southwest  to Thomasville and east  to Interstate 75 at Hahira. Georgia State Route 33 leads north out of town as Robert Street towards Moultrie; southbound it leaves as County Line Road towards Barwick and Boston.

Demographics

As of the census of 2000, there were 711 people, 301 households, and 191 families residing in the city. The racial makeup of the city was 71.31% White, 25.32% African American, 1.27% Native American, 0.70% Asian, 0.42% from other races, and 0.98% from two or more races. Hispanic or Latino of any race were 0.98% of the population.

There were 301 households, out of which 22.9% had children under the age of 18 living with them, 40.2% were married couples living together, 17.9% had a female householder with no husband present, and 36.5% were non-families. 31.9% of all households were made up of individuals, and 18.6% had someone living alone who was 65 years of age or older.  The average household size was 2.36 and the average family size was 2.96.

In the city, the population was spread out, with 22.5% under the age of 18, 8.9% from 18 to 24, 25.2% from 25 to 44, 26.2% from 45 to 64, and 17.3% who were 65 years of age or older.  The median age was 40 years. For every 100 females there were 81.8 males.  For every 100 females age 18 and over, there were 79.5 males.

The median income for a household in the city was $22,448, and the median income for a family was $25,938. Males had a median income of $27,000 versus $18,382 for females. The per capita income for the city was $11,915.  About 18.0% of families and 24.6% of the population were below the poverty line, including 26.4% of those under age 18 and 30.2% of those age 65 or over.

History

The community was originally known as McDonald, named after one of two prominent families in the area. However, concerns were raised about misdirected mail, resulting from confusion between McDonald, in the southern part of the state, and McDonough located in the north. The community was then renamed after an early postmaster, Duncan D. Peacock, "Pavo" being the Latin word meaning "peacock".

Arts and culture
The city celebrates "Peacock Day" on the second Saturday each May.

References

External links
 City of Pavo Official Site

Cities in Brooks County, Georgia
Cities in Thomas County, Georgia
Cities in Georgia (U.S. state)
Cities in the Valdosta metropolitan area